The Pahlavi Crown was the coronation crown used during the Pahlavi dynasty (1925–1979). It is held amongst the Iranian crown jewels by the current government of Iran.

Background
Following the ascension of the Pahlavi dynasty in 1925, Reza Shah ordered a group of Iranian jewelers, under the supervision of Haj Serajeddin Javaheri, to create a new crown to replace the Kiani Crown, which had been used by the Qajar dynasty.  Inspiration for the new design was drawn from paintings and historical references to crowns used during the Sassanid Empire, which had ruled Persia from 224 to 651 AD.

The Pahlavi Crown was commissioned and first used for the coronation of Reza Shah on 25 April 1926.  It was used for the last time during the coronation of his son and successor Mohammad Reza Shah Pahlavi on 26 October 1967.  The crown is currently on display with the rest of the Iranian Crown Jewels at the Treasury of National Jewels in Tehran.

Although the Pahlavi Crown was not assembled until the early 20th century, the stones used in its production, as per tradition, were selected from the thousands of loose stones already in the Iranian Imperial Treasury.

Composition
The frame of the crown is made of gold, silver and red velvet. It has a maximum height of 29.8 cm, a width of 19.8 cm and weighs nearly 2,080 grams.  A staggering 3,380 diamonds, totaling , are set into the object.  The largest of these is a  yellow brilliant diamond which is centrally placed in a sunburst of white diamonds. 

Found in three rows are 369 nearly identical natural white pearls.

In popular culture
 In Peter O'Donnell's 1981 Modesty Blaise novel The Xanadu Talisman, Modesty and Willie Garvin are pursued by the Moroccan underworld on a quest to recover the Pahlavi Crown.

See also

References

Individual crowns
Iranian National Jewels
Pahlavi
National symbols of Iran
Pahlavi dynasty